Nicola Napolitano (February 28, 1838 – September 10, 1863), also known by the nickname Caprariello, a nickname derived from his activity of goatherd, was born in Nola from the peasants Sabato and Carmela from Naples. Illiterate, having never attended  school, he was recruited in 1861 in the military service established by the newborn Kingdom of Italy.

Disobedient, he was arrested and forced to attend military service, but deserted almost immediately, joining the brigands led by the La Gala brothers from Nola, where he soon played an important role, gaining a reputation for his fierceness and strength, to the point of being able to put together and lead his own brigand band during 1862.

Arrested after a shooting fight at the beginning of September 1863, he was executed by shooting in his birth city, Nola, on the 10th of that month.

References

1838 births
1863 deaths
People from Nola
Italian bandits
Goatherds
Italian soldiers
People executed by Italy by firing squad